Petra Anne Levin is an American microbiologist. She is a professor in the department of biology and co-director of the Plant and Microbial Biosciences Graduate Program at Washington University in St. Louis.

Education and early career 

Levin graduated, cum laude, from Williams College with a bachelor of arts in biology in 1989. She worked as a science teacher at the American School in Switzerland from 1989 to 1990. Levin completed a doctor of philosophy in biology from Harvard University in 1996. Her dissertation was titled Asymmetric Division During Spore Formation in Bacillus subtillis. Her doctoral advisor was Richard Losick. Levin was a postdoctoral fellow in the MIT Department of Biology under advisor Alan Grossman.

Career 
Levin was an assistant professor at Washington University in St. Louis in the department of biology. She was an associate professor from 2008 to 2015 before becoming a professor. In 2015, she became the co-director of the Plant and Microbial Biosciences Graduate Program at Washington University.

Levin became a member of the editorial advisory board of Molecular Microbiology in 2008. In 2016, Levin became a front matter editor of PLOS Genetics. In 2018, she became an editorial board member of Current Biology.

Awards and honors 
Levin was awarded a National Science Foundation CAREER Award in 2005. She was a Fulbright scholar in the Netherlands from 2015 to 2016.

References

External links 

 

Living people
Year of birth missing (living people)
American microbiologists
20th-century American biologists
21st-century American biologists
20th-century American women scientists
21st-century American women scientists
American women biologists
Women microbiologists
Williams College alumni
Harvard University alumni
Washington University in St. Louis faculty
Academic journal editors
Fulbright alumni